"The Royal Salute", also known as "The Health of the Shah" was the royal and national anthem of Qajar Iran between 1873 and 1909. The French musician Alfred Jean Baptiste Lemaire composed this anthem in 1873 on the orders of Naser al-Din Shah. It had no lyrics.
Salâm-e Shâh was played in official ceremonies during the reigns of Naser al-Din Shah, Mozaffar ad-Din Shah and Mohammad Ali Shah. It was also played as the Persian (Iranian) national anthem during Naser al-Din Shah’s and Mozaffar ad-Din Shah’s European tours.

In 1909, after the fall of Mohammad Ali Shah, the anthem was abolished, and after the coronation of his son and successor Ahmad Shah in 1914, Salute of the Sublime State of Persia was adopted as the Iranian national anthem.

Rearrangement 
This anthem was rearranged, recomposed and orchestrated by the Iranian composer Siavash Beizai. Only the main parts of this song are derived from the original version. There are also some harmonic and formal corrections in this piece. The introduction, the middle part, and closing part were composed by Siavash Beizai too. Due to the great popularity of this anthem, it has been increasingly misused by the official Iranian Radio and Television and the government without any permission from Siavash Beizai. 

Bijan Taraqi was asked by Peyman Soltani, the leader of Melal Orchestra of Iran, to write lyrics for the old national anthem. This new version of the anthem was performed in October 2005 by the Melal Orchestra of Iran. The singer in this version was Salar Aghili.

"Irân-e Javân" (Persian: "ايران جوان") means "Young Iran" in English. It is also known as "Vatanam" (Persian: "وطنم"), which means "My Homeland".

Lyrics
  نامِ جاوید وطن		
صبحِ امید وطن
جلوه کن در آسمان		
همچو مهرِ جاودان
وطن ای هستیِ من		
شور و سرمستیِ من
جلوه کن در آسمان		
همچو مهرِ جاودان
بشنو سوزِ سخنم		
که هم‌آوازِ تو منم
همهٔ جان و تنم		
!وطنم وطنم وطنم وطنم
بشنو سوزِ سخنم		
که نواگر این چمنم
همهٔ جان و تنم		
!وطنم وطنم وطنم وطنم
همه با یک نام و نشان		
به تفاوتِ هر رنگ و زبان
همه با یک نام و نشان		
به تفاوتِ هر رنگ و زبان
همه شاد و خوش و نغمه‌زنان		
ز صلابتِ ایران جوان
ز صلابت ایران جوان		
ز صلابتِ ایرانِ جوان 

Nâm-e jâvîd-e vatan
Sobh-e omîd-e vatan
Jelve kon dar âsmân
Hamčô mehr-e jâvdân
Vatan ey hasti-ye man
Šûro sarmasti-ye man
Jelve kon dar âsmân
Hamčô mehr-eh jâvdân
Bešenô sûz-e soxanam
Ke ham âvâz-e tô manam
Hame-ye jân-o tanam
Vatanam Vatanam Vatanam Vatanam! 
Bešenô sûz-e soxanam
Ke navâgar-e în čamanam
Hame-ye jân-o tanam
Vatanam Vatanam Vatanam Vatanam! 
Hame bâ yek nâm-o nešân
Be tafâvot-e har rang-o zabân
Hame bâ yek nâm-o nešân
Be tafâvot-e har rang-o zabân
Hame šâd-o khôš-o naǧme zanân
Ze salâbat-e Îrân-e javân
Ze salâbat-e Îrân-e javân
Ze salâbat-e Îrân-e javân 

Forever name, Motherland

Morning of hope, Motherland

Shine in sky

like immortal love

****

Motherland, my existence

My passion and excitment

Shine in sky

like immortal love

****

Hear my burning speech

I'm the one who sings with you

All my life and body

My Motherland, My Motherland, My Motherland, My Motherland

****

Hear my burning speech

I'm the creator of this meadow

All my life and body

My Motherland, My Motherland, My Motherland, My Motherland

****

Everyone with a single name and symbol

With every different color and language

Everyone with a single name and symbol

With every different color and language

****

Everyone happy and singing

Because of young Iran's greatness

Because of young Iran's greatness

Because of young Iran's greatness

References 

Historical national anthems
Iranian patriotic songs
Royal anthems
Asian anthems
National anthem compositions in A minor
Military of Iran
Qajar Iran